The 1985–86 Purdue Boilermakers men's basketball team represented Purdue University during the 1985–86 college basketball season. Led by head coach Gene Keady, the team played their home games at Mackey Arena in West Lafayette, Indiana. The Boilermakers finished fourth in the Big Ten standings and received an at-large bid to the NCAA tournament as No. 6 seed in the Southeast Region. Purdue was upset in the opening round by No. 11 seed and eventual Final Four participant LSU, 94–87 in 2OT, in a game that was played on the Tigers home floor. The Boilermakers finished the season with a 22–10 record (11–7 Big Ten).

Roster

Schedule and results

|-
!colspan=9 style=| Non-Conference Regular Season

|-
!colspan=9 style=| Big Ten Regular Season

|-
!colspan=9 style=|NCAA Tournament

Rankings

References

Purdue
Purdue
Purdue Boilermakers men's basketball seasons